Good 4 We is the debut studio album of British group D-Influence. It was released in 1992 by East West Records and Acid Jazz Records. The album was produced by D-Influence themselves, along with producers Blacksmith. 

"I'm the One" was released in 1989 on Acid Jazz Records and then again in 1990. "Good Lover" was a club hit but only reached No. 66 on the official top 40. However, it was ranked No. 7 on the Blues & Soul all-time top 20 songs. The group embarked on a tour, entitled, Good 4 We. The tour saw the band perform across the world at over 150 shows. They appeared on the first-ever Later with Jools Holland show and toured with Michael Jackson and Prince in promotion for the album. This culminated in the band winning 'Best Live Band' at the UK Black Music Awards.

Critical reception

AllMusic gave the album a three out of five star rating.

Singles
The band's most recognized song, "Good Lover", was written when the band were in Milo Studios. The label was asking for a hit and the band hated being asked for just that. They stayed in the studio, did an all-nighter then at 3 am, lead singer Sarah Webb sang the lines that launched the song. "Good Lover" was played across that summer.

"Good Lover" reached No. 11 on the Blues & Soul Top British Soul Singles chart.

Tracklisting

References

1992 debut albums
East West Records albums